In Thailand, cannabis, known by the name Ganja was decriminalized on June 9, 2022.  Medical use, with patients requiring a prescription, has been made legal since 2018. Since 2022, the Thai Food and Drug Administration officially removed  cannabis plant from the Category 5 narcotics list. Possession, cultivation, distribution, consumption, and sales of all cannabis plant parts are legal. Cannabis extracts and cannabis products (including edibles, food supplements, cosmetics, etc.) containing THC more than 0.2% by weight are still categorized as narcotics. Import and export of cannabis are still highly regulated. Recreational use of cannabis products is discouraged but legal. There is no restriction on THC content for cannabis plant parts. Sales of cannabis plant parts, products, and edibles are prohibited to minors (< 20 years old), pregnant women, and breastfeeding women. Cannabis smoke is considered a public nuisance and thus prohibited in public areas.

Cannabis appears to have been introduced to Thailand from India, with the similarity of the Thai name to the Indian term ganja cited as evidence. Cannabis has historically been used in Southeast Asia as an ingredient, a kitchen condiment, a medicine, and a source of fiber. Laborers were known to use it as a muscle relaxer. It was reportedly used to ease women's labor pains.

On 8 May 2022, Thailand's health minister Anutin Charnvirakul announced in a Facebook post that the government will distribute one million free cannabis plants to households across the country, starting June 9. The move is said to be a step further into Thailand's plan to use cannabis as a cash crop.

Legalization and decriminalization
The possession, cultivation, sale, and use of cannabis was criminalized by the Cannabis Act 2477 BE (1935) and again by the Narcotics Act 2522 BE (1979). In 2018, Thailand became the first Asian nation to legalize medical cannabis.

Cannabis became decriminalized  and smoking/vaping at public places can still attract penalty/ imprisonment under public nuisance .

Cannabis dispensaries were available as early as April 2022. On June 9, 2022, all cannabis plant parts were entirely removed from the narcotic list, decriminalizing all cannabis-related crime. Around 4,200 prisoners were released as a result of the decriminalization on the same day.

Regulations

Consumption
There is no restriction on the consumption of cannabis plant parts, however, cannabis oils and tinctures with over 0.2% THC are still considered to be illegal. Consumption of these extracts is only reserved for medical use under prescription. Cannabis smoking is legal for personal use in private areas but prohibited in public areas by the Public Health Act 2535 BE (1992) with the fine being up to 25,000 Baht (~US$700) and or imprisonment for up to 3 months.

Cultivation
There are currently no restrictions on how many plants each individual can cultivate. The specific law regulating cannabis is still pending in Thai parliament as of 2023. However, the government urges people to register their cannabis plantation on the website or the application "Plookganja" (meaning "Let's grow cannabis") in case that the future cannabis law may require the license.

Supply
Thai law essentially excludes all foreign companies as well as foreign majority companies incorporated in Thailand from producing, selling, importing, exporting, and processing cannabis. The move has been viewed as an effort to protect local companies from the onslaught of highly resourceful and modern technology equipped foreign actors, however "imported" strains are widely available.

Distribution
On 11 May, Thailand's first two full-time clinics dispensing cannabis oil for medical treatment were inaugurated. The move is in line with the government's intentions to promote licensed use of medical marijuana to address various health conditions. These two clinics are an addition to 25 part-time clinics that are operating since the legalization of the drug under the new legislation.
If this experience produces promising results, the government is all set to open two more clinics as a part of a planned nationwide network of marijuana clinics. The people who were using illegal expensive medical marijuana from underground suppliers are most likely to benefit from it. In addition, the FDA has approved all hospitals of the Public Health Ministry to prescribe medical cannabis to people with approved medical conditions.

References

 
Drug policy of Thailand
Thailand